Ringtown is a borough in Schuylkill County, Pennsylvania,  United States. It is approximately 5 miles north northwest of Shenandoah and 17 miles west southwest of Hazleton.  Other nearby towns and  boroughs include Zion Grove, Pattersonville and Nuremberg.

Geography
Ringtown is located at  (40.857604, −76.233718).

Demographics

At the 2000 census, there were 826 people, 319 households and 231 families living in the borough. The racial make-up of the borough was 98.79% White, 0.12% African American, 0.48% Asian and 0.61% from other races. Hispanic or Latino of any race were 0.61%.

Of the 319 households, 30.4% had children under the age of 18 living with them, 59.2% were married couples living together, 8.8% had a female householder with no husband present, and 27.3% were non-families. Of all households, 23.2% were one person and 12.9% were one person aged 65 or older. The average household size was 2.59 and the average family size was 3.09.

The age distribution was 24.7% under the age of 18, 6.4% from 18 to 24, 25.7% from 25 to 44, 22.5% from 45 to 64 and 20.7% 65 or older. The median age was 39 years. For every 100 females there were 89.4 males. For every 100 females age 18 and over, there were 92.6 males.
le
The median household income was $36,563 and the median family income  was $43,125. Males had a median income of $32,685 and females $22,000. The per capita income was $20,345. About 2.6% of families and 4.6% of the population were below the poverty line, including 4.4% of those under age 18 and 11.2% of those age 65 or over.

Notable person
Danny Litwhiler, baseball player and coach

References

Populated places established in 1833
Boroughs in Schuylkill County, Pennsylvania
1909 establishments in Pennsylvania